Chen Chien-chin (born 19 June 1940) is a Taiwanese professional golfer.

Chen played on the Japan Golf Tour, winning once.

Professional wins

Japan Golf Tour wins
1976 Chubu Open

Other wins
1967 Okinawa Open (as an amateur)

Team appearances
Amateur
Eisenhower Trophy (representing Taiwan): 1960, 1962, 1964, 1966, 1968, 1970, 1972

External links

Taiwanese male golfers
Japan Golf Tour golfers
1940 births
Living people